Falconer may refer to: 

 A person skilled in the art of falconry

People
 Falconer (surname), a family name
 Falconer Larkworthy (1833–1928), New Zealand banker and financier
 Falconer Madan (1851—1935), librarian of the Bodleian Library of Oxford University
 Charlie Falconer, Baron Falconer of Thoroton, a British politician

Places
 Falconer, New York, United States, a village
 Mount Falconer, Victoria Land, Antarctica

Arts and entertainment
 The Falconer (Simonds), a bronze sculpture in Central Park, New York City
 The Falconer (Hansen), a bronze sculpture in Portland, Oregon
 Falconer (band), a power metal band from Sweden
 Falconer (album), an album by the band
 Falconer (novel), a novel by John Cheever
 "The Falconer", a recurring sketch on the TV program Saturday Night Live
 The Falconer (1997 film), with Iain Sinclair
 The Falconer (film), a 2021 film

Military
 AN/USQ-163 Falconer, a weapon system used by the United States Air Force Air and Space Operations Center
 Operation Falconer, the Australian contribution to the 2003 invasion of Iraq
 MQM-57 Falconer, a target drone in the Radioplane BTT family

Other uses
 Falconer School, a boys school in Hertfordshire, England
 Falconer, a  Torrey Pines High School newspaper

See also
 Lord Falconer of Halkerton, a title in the Scottish peerage
 AWM/MAA Falconer Lecturer, lectures founded in 1996 named after Etta Z. Falconer
 
 Grand Falconer (disambiguation), a European position or title
 Falcon (disambiguation)
 Falkner (disambiguation)
 Faulkner (disambiguation)
 Faulknor (disambiguation)
 Fawkner (disambiguation)
Faulconer (disambiguation)